Lampiri may refer to several villages in Greece:

Lampiri, a village in the community Ziria, Achaea
Lampiri, Aetolia-Acarnania, a village in the municipality Agrinio

See also
 Lamprey (disambiguation)